The interplay of exercise and music has long been discussed, crossing the disciplines of biomechanics, neurology, physiology, and sport psychology. Exercise and music involves the use of music before, during, and/or after performing a physical activity. Listening to music while exercising is done to improve aspects of exercise, such as strength output, exercise duration, and motivation. The use of music during exercise can provide physiological benefits as well as psychological benefits.

Major empirical findings

Physiological effects 
People "automatically feel the beat" of the music they listen to and instinctively adjust their walking pace and heart rate to the tempo of the music
. Listening to music during exercise can promote rhythmic activity due to synchronous music.

In a study published in 2009, researchers at the Research Institute for Sport and Exercise Sciences at Liverpool John Moores University had 12 subjects ride a stationary bicycle at a pace that they could sustain for 30 minutes while listening to a song of the subject's choice. In successive trials, they rode the bikes again, with the tempo of the music variously increased or decreased by 10%, without the subject's knowledge. The researchers results showed that the riders heart rate and mileage decreased when the tempo was slowed, while they rode a greater distance, increased their heart rate and enjoyed the music more at the faster tempo. Though the participants thought their workout was harder at the more upbeat tempo, the researchers found that when the faster-paced music was heard while exercising "the participants chose to accept, and even prefer, a greater degree of effort".

In young untrained subjects, music was found to cause an increase in exercise duration due to fast and loud music when compared to other subjects that did not listen to music at all. Loud music may improve performance however overexposure may lead to noise-induced hearing problems.

Scientists at the University of Wisconsin–La Crosse found in a 2003 study that participants who chose to listen to faster-paced music generated a higher heart rate, pedaled harder and generated more power, increasing their level of work by as much as 15% by diverting their focus to the music. The study tested 20 volunteers who listened to an MP3 player loaded with a mix of 13 songs that they selected and then rode an exercise bike for an hour at a pace and gear of their choice. The study found that heart rates rose from 133 to 146 beats per minute and power output increased accordingly, when listening to the tempo-less sound of crashing waves versus music with a medium to fast tempo.

To further this idea, a study from the New York Times shows how music helps boost workouts. This experiment was done by testing a control group of people working out in a normal workout setting and the same group of people working out with machines that incorporated beats and rhythms into each rep. To do this, they installed the kits into three different workout machines, one a stair-stepper, the other two weight machines with bars that could be raised or pulled down to stimulate various muscles. Thomas Hans Fritz, a researcher at the Max Planck Institute who led the study said, “Participants could express themselves on the machines by, for instance, modulating rhythms and creating melodies.” Throughout each workout, the researchers monitored the force their volunteers generated while using the machines, as well as whether the weight lifters’ movements tended to stutter or flow and how much oxygen the volunteers consumed, a reliable measure of physical effort. Afterward, the scientists asked the volunteers to rate the tolerability or unpleasantness of the session, on a scale from 1 to 20.

Max strength is unaffected by the use of music during exercise.

Psychological effects 
Listening to music while exercising has been found in multiple studies to create an increased sense of motivation, distracting the mind while increasing heart rate. Faster tempo music has been found by researchers to motivate exercisers to work harder when performing at a moderate pace, but peak performance has been found to be unaffected by listening to music.

A 2004 study by a research team from Australia, Israel and the United States found that runners performing at a pace where they were at 90% of their peak oxygen uptake enjoyed listening to music. The music had no effect however on their heart rate or running pace, regardless of the music's tempo.

Generally, studies suggest that athletes use music in purposeful ways to facilitate training and performance. In one study, seventy elite Swedish athletes completed a questionnaire relating the empirical motives for listening to music. The results showed that most of them often listened to music during pre-event, pre-training sessions, and warm-ups. The athletes gave as reasons for listening to music that they felt that it increased activation, positive affect, motivation, performance levels, and flow. There are also types workout music using brainwave entrainment that claims to boost performance.

References

Exercise physiology
Music psychology